Charles Harris Jr. (born September 21) is an American college basketball player for the Butler Bulldogs of the Big East Conference.

High school career
Harris played basketball for Gonzaga College High School in Washington, D.C. for four years under coach Steve Turner. He helped his team win two Washington Catholic Athletic Conference and D.C. State Athletic Association titles. As a senior, Harris averaged 12 points, four rebounds and four assists per game. He committed to playing college basketball for Butler over offers from Penn State and Virginia.

College career
Harris scored 20 points in a 73–61 upset of Villanova on February 28, 2021. On March 6, Harris posted a freshman season-high 29 points, six rebounds and four assists in a 93–73 loss to Creighton. As a freshman, he averaged 12.9 points, three rebounds and 2.3 assists per game.  Harris was a unanimous Big East All-Freshman Team selection. He became the first Butler freshman since Tony Warren in the 1979–80 season to lead the team in scoring.

Career statistics

College

|-
| style="text-align:left;"| 2020–21
| style="text-align:left;"| Butler
| 24 || 14 || 29.8 || .401 || .403 || .836 || 3.0 || 2.3 || 1.0 || .1 || 12.9
|-
| style="text-align:left;"| 2021-22
| style="text-align:left;"| Butler
| 31 || 21 || 28.8 || .378 || .298 || .740 || 2.7 || 1.6 || .5 || .1 || 11.4
|-

Personal life
Harris is the third of four children and was born in Georgia. He moved to Louisiana and then to Virginia. His father Charles Sr. played basketball for Lincoln University.

References

External links
Butler Bulldogs bio

Living people
American men's basketball players
Basketball players from Virginia
People from Ashburn, Virginia
Point guards
Butler Bulldogs men's basketball players
Gonzaga College High School alumni
Year of birth missing (living people)